The 1931 college football season saw the USC Trojans win the Knute Rockne Memorial Trophy as national champion under the Dickinson System, as well as the No. 1 position from each of the other three contemporary major selectors (Boand, Dunkel, and Houlgate Systems). Rockne, who had coached Notre Dame to a championship in 1930, had been killed in a plane crash on March 31, 1931. For the first time, the champion under the Dickinson System also played in a postseason game. The 1932 Rose Bowl, promoted as a national championship game between the best teams of East and West, matched USC and Tulane, No. 1 and No. 2 in the Dickinson ratings. USC won, 21–12, and was awarded the Albert Russel Erskine Trophy.

Two years later, historian Parke H. Davis selected Pittsburgh and Purdue (No. 9 and No. 10 in the Dickinson ratings) as "National Champion Foot Ball Teams" for 1931; he was the only the NCAA-designated "major selector" to choose either team. Davis’ work has been criticized for having a heavy Eastern bias, with little regard for the South and the West Coast. Pittsburgh claims a 1931 national championship on this basis, while Purdue does not.

Conference and program changes

New conferences
Four conferences began play in 1931:
 Border Conference – conference active through the 1962 season
 Dixie Conference – conference active through the 1941 season; (the first of three conferences to share this name)
Lone Star Conference – an active NCAA Division II conference
 North Dakota College Athletic Conference – an NAIA conference active through the 1999 season
One conference played its final season in 1931:
Texas Intercollegiate Athletic Association – active since the 1909 season

Membership changes

Program changes
 Oregon State Agricultural College (Oregon State) Aggies officially changed their nickname to the now-eponymous Beavers.

September
September 26 The season started with an upset.  St. Mary's College, a relatively small school in San Francisco, defeated USC 13–7.  Tulane beat Ole Miss, 31–0 and Tennessee beat Maryville 33–0, while Pittsburgh beat Miami University, 61–0.

October

October 3 St. Mary's won again, at California, 14–0, and USC won its first game of the season, beating Oregon State 30–0.  Tennessee beat Clemson 44–0 and Tulane defeated Texas A&M 7–0.  Northwestern beat Nebraska 19–7.  Purdue opened its season for the home crowd with a doubleheader, beating Ohio's Western Reserve 28–0, followed by a 19–0 win over Iowa's Coe College 

Pittsburgh won at Iowa, 20–0  Georgia beat Virginia Tech 40–0
Harvard defeated Bates College, 28–0 and Yale beat Maine, 19–0
Notre Dame won at Indiana 25–0

October 10 In Chicago, a crowd of 75,000 turned out at Soldier Field to watch Northwestern and Notre Dame played to a 0–0 tie in a driving rain. Tennessee defeated Ole Miss 38–0.  USC beat Washington State 38–6.  Harvard beat New Hampshire, 39–0.  In New Haven, the Georgia Bulldogs handed the Yale Bulldogs their first defeat, 26–7.  Purdue beat Illinois 7–0
Pittsburgh beat West Virginia 34–0.  Tulane defeated Spring Hill College 40–0 and St. Mary's beat the West Coast Army team, 21–7

October 17 Tulane and Vanderbilt, both 3–0–0, met at Nashville, with Tulane winning 19–0
Tennessee and Alabama, both 3–0–0, met at Knoxville, with UT winning 25–0.  USC defeated visiting Oregon 53–0.  Northwestern beat visiting UCLA 19–0
Georgia won at North Carolina, 32–7.  Yale beat Chicago 27–0 and Harvard got past Army 14–13.  Purdue lost at Wisconsin 21–14.  Pittsburgh defeated Western Reserve, 32–0.  Notre Dame defeated Drake 63–0.  St. Mary's beat the University of San Francisco, 14–6.  Neither SMC or USF play college football anymore.

October 24  Notre Dame (3–0–0) and Pittsburgh (4–0–0) met at South Bend, with Notre Dame winning 25–12.  Tulane beat Georgia Tech 33–0; Tulane had outscored its five opponents 130–0.  Tennessee won at North Carolina, 7–0; it had outscored its five foes 147–0.  Georgia beat Vanderbilt 9–0.  Harvard beat visiting Texas, 35–7 and Yale and Army played to a 6–6 tie, while in Pittsburgh, Purdue defeated Carnegie Tech 13–6.  Northwestern defeated Ohio State in Columbus, 10–0.  St. Mary's beat visiting Gonzaga University, 13–7.  USC won at California 6–0

October 31 Tulane beat Mississippi State, but not without surrendering its first points, in a 59–7 win; likewise, Tennessee beat Duke, but was scored upon for the first time, in its 25–2 win
Georgia won at Florida, 33–6.  Northwestern beat visiting Illinois 32–6 and Purdue won at Chicago 14–6.  Harvard beat Virginia 19–0 and Yale and Dartmouth played to a 33–33 tie.  Pittsburgh won at Penn State, 41–6
Notre Dame defeated Carnegie Tech 19–0.  Surprising St. Mary's extended its record to 6–0–0 with a 21–14 win over Santa Clara.

November
November 7 USC (4–1–0) and Stanford (5–0–1) met at Los Angeles, and USC won 19–0.
In Montgomery, Alabama, Tulane shut out Auburn 27–0.  Tennessee beat visiting Carson-Newman, 31–0.  Northwestern beat Minnesota, 32–14.  Purdue beat Centenary College 49–6.  Before a crowd of 65,000 at Yankee Stadium, Georgia stayed unbeaten as it defeated New York University 7–6, with the aid of a 97–yard kickoff return by Buster Mott in the third quarter.  Harvard beat Dartmouth 7–6 and Yale beat St. John's College of Maryland, 52–0.  Pittsburgh beat Carnegie Tech 14–6.  Notre Dame beat Pennsylvania 49–0.  St. Mary's suffered its first defeat, to the visiting Olympic Club, 10–0

November 11  In an Armistice Day game at Los Angeles, UCLA handed St. Mary's its second straight loss, 12–0

November 14 Tulane (7–0–0) and Georgia (6–0–0) faced off in Athens before a crowd of 36,000 for the rights to best in the South.  The Green Wave rolled over Georgia's Bulldogs 20–7.  Tennessee defeated Vanderbilt 21–7.  USC beat visiting Montana 69–0.  Harvard defeated Holy Cross 7–0.  Purdue defeated Iowa 22–0 and Northwestern edged Indiana 7–6.  Pittsburgh beat visiting Army 26–0.  In Baltimore, Notre Dame beat Navy 20–0

November 21 Notre Dame (6–0–1) had not lost a football game in almost three years, its last defeat having been to the USC Trojans on 27–14 on  December 1, 1928.  A crowd of 52,000 turned out as (5–1–0) USC came to the Notre Dame campus in South Bend for the first time ever.  The Trojans trailed 14–0 going into the fourth quarter, and was trailing 14–13 in the final minutes after Johnny Baker's extra point attempt had been blocked.  In the final minute, Baker kicked a 34–yard field goal for a 16–14 win, Notre Dame's first loss in 27 starts.   Tulane beat Sewanee 40–0.  Northwestern won at Iowa 9–0, and Purdue won at Indiana, 19–0.  In Columbus, Ga., Georgia beat Auburn 12–6.  Yale (3–1–2) hosted Harvard (7–0–0) and won 3–0

November 26  On Thanksgiving Day, Pitt and Nebraska, both 7–1–0, met in Pittsburgh, with the home team winning 40–0.  Tennessee and Kentucky played to a 6–6 tie in Lexington.  St. Mary's defeated Oregon 16–0.

November 28 In Yankee Stadium, a crowd of 80,000 turned out in spite of a snowstorm, and watched as Notre Dame was beaten by Army, 12–0, for its second consecutive defeat after 26 games without a loss.  Meanwhile, 40,000 watched in Chicago as Northwestern (7–0–1) and Purdue (8–1–0) met in a "post-season charity game" on a frozen field in Chicago, with the Boilermakers handing the Wildcats their first defeat, 7–0.

Yale beat Princeton 51–14.  Tulane defeated LSU 34–7 and Georgia defeated Georgia Tech 35–6

December
December 5 Tulane beat Washington State 28–14 to close at 11–0–0, unbeaten and untied, while Tennessee played NYU at Yankee Stadium, winning 13–0 to finish at 8–0–1.  USC defeated Washington 44–7.  St. Mary's closed its season with a 7–2 win over Southern Methodist (SMU).

December 12 
USC and Georgia, both 8–1–0, met in Los Angeles, and the visiting Bulldogs were crushed 60–0

1932 Rose Bowl

For the first time, the Rose Bowl matchup included the No. 1 ranked team under the Dickinson ratings. That team, USC, was matched against No. 2 ranked Tulane. A crowd of 83,000 turned out in Pasadena, a Rose Bowl record. Though Tulane had outgained USC in total yards (378 vs. 233) and first downs (18 vs. 11), the USC Trojans made the most of their three scoring opportunities.  In the third quarter, Erny Pinckert ran 28 yards for a touchdown, then, after the Trojans recovered a Tulane fumble, scored again.  USC went up 21–0 before Tulane fought back with two touchdowns, and only a tough Trojan defense held the Green Wave from scoring more.  The final result was USC 21, Tulane 12.

Conference standings

Major conference standings

Independents

Minor conferences

Minor conference standings

Dickinson System
The AP sportswriters' poll would not begin continuously until 1936. (although, the first time was a one instance publishing in 1934)  Frank G. Dickinson, an economics professor at the University of Illinois, had invented the Dickinson System to rank colleges based upon their records and the strength of their opposition.

The system was originally designed to rank teams in the Big Nine (later the Big Ten) conference.  Chicago clothing manufacturer Jack Rissman then persuaded Dickinson to rank the nation's teams under the system, and awarded the Rissman Trophy to the winning university.

The system awarded 30 points for a win over a "strong team", and 20 for a win over a "weak team".  Losses were awarded points (15 for loss to a strong team, 10 for loss to a weak team).  Ties were treated as half a win and half a loss (22.5 for a tie with a strong team, 15 for a tie with a weak team).  An average was then derived by dividing the points by games played.

Final Dickinson rankings
Although Tulane was unbeaten and untied (11–0), it was second to the USC with a 9–1 record.

Statistical leaders
Player scoring most points: Bob Campiglio, West Liberty, 145

See also
 1931 College Football All-America Team

References